Libys Marmolejo (born ) is a Colombian volleyball player. She is part of the Colombia women's national volleyball team.

She participated in the 2015 FIVB Volleyball World Grand Prix.
On club level she played for Liga Antioqueña in 2015.

References

1992 births
Living people
Colombian women's volleyball players
Place of birth missing (living people)
21st-century Colombian women